Putijarra is one of the Wati languages of the large Pama–Nyungan family of Australia. It is sometimes counted as a dialect of the Western Desert Language, but is classified as a distinct language in Bowern.

It is one of the components of the Martu Wangka koine.

References

Wati languages
Endangered indigenous Australian languages in Western Australia